The European Senior Chess Championship is a chess tournament for senior chess players organised by the European Chess Union  (ECU). Beginning in 2001, entry was open to men aged sixty or over (60+) by January 1 of the year the tournament starts. The corresponding, women's category had an age restriction of fifty years or over (50+). 

In 2014 the competition was split into separate tournaments for the age categories of 65+ and 50+ and these age restrictions were unified across both genders. The format of each tournament is a 9-round Swiss, the overall winners being awarded the respective titles of "European Senior Chess Champion" and "European Senior Women's Chess Champion" in each age category. Similar titles are awarded for rapidplay and blitz, but these are not shown below.

List of winners
{| class="wikitable"
! # !! Year !! Location !! Overall winner !! Women champion
|-
| 1 || 2001 ||  St. Vincent
|  ||
|-
| 2 || 2002 ||  St. Vincent
|  ||
|-
| 3 || 2003 ||  St. Vincent
|  || 
|-
| 4 || 2004 ||  Arvier
|  || 
|-
| 5 || 2005 ||  Bad Homburg
|  || 
|-
| 6 || 2006 ||  Davos
|  || 
|-
| 7 || 2007 ||  Hockenheim
|  || 
|-
| 8 || 2008 ||  Davos
|  || 
|-
| 9 || 2009 ||  Rogaška Slatina
|  || 
|-
| 10 || 2010 ||  Thessaloniki
|  || 
|-
| 11 || 2011 ||  Courmayeur
|  || 
|-
| 12 || 2012 ||  Kaunas
|  || 
|-
| 13 || 2013 ||  Plovdiv
|  || 
|-
| 14 || 2014 ||  Porto
|  (65+)  (50+)||  (65+) (50+)
|-
| 15 || 2015 ||  Eretria
|  (65+)  (50+)|| (65+) (50+)
|-
| 16 || 2016 ||  Yerevan
|  (65+)  (50+) ||  (65+) (50+)
|-
| 17 || 2017 ||  Sabadell
| (65+) (50+)
| (65+) (50+)
|-
| 18 || 2018 ||  Drammen
| (65+) (50+)
| (65+) (50+)
|-
| 19 || 2019 ||  Rhodes
| (65+) (50+)
| (65+) (50+)
|-
| 20 || 2021 ||  Budoni
| (65+) (50+)
| (65+) (50+)
|-
| 21 || 2022 ||  Lublin
| (65+) (50+)
| (65+) (50+)
|}

See also
 World Senior Chess Championship
 European Individual Chess Championship
 European Junior Chess Championship
 European Youth Chess Championship
 Asian Senior Chess Championship

References

Results 2002 from FIDE
Results 2003 from FIDE
Results 2004 from FIDE
Results 2005 from FIDE
Results 2006 from FIDE
Results 2007 from FIDE
Homepage of the 2007 edition
List of winners until 2006 in the Manual 2007 of the European Chess Union

Supranational chess championships
Women's chess competitions
2001 in chess
Chess in Europe